Quincy Demond Earl Morgan (born September 23, 1977) is a former American football wide receiver in the National Football League (NFL) for the Cleveland Browns, Dallas Cowboys, Pittsburgh Steelers, and Denver Broncos. With the Steelers, he won Super Bowl XL over the Seattle Seahawks. He played college football at Kansas State University.

Early years
Morgan attended South Garland High School in Garland, Texas. In football, he was a three-year letterman. As a junior, he was named All-State by The Dallas Morning News. As a senior, he received Team's Most Valuable Player, All-Area, All-Conference, All-State and prep All-American honors.

College career
Morgan enrolled at Kansas City Kansas Community College during the spring of 1998, where he ran track. He transferred to Blinn Community College at the end of the year. As a freshman, he helped the team win the Junior College National Championship. As a sophomore, he had 38 receptions for 645 yards, 9 touchdowns and was considered one of the top wide receivers in Junior College. He transferred to Kansas State University after the season.

As a junior, he posted 42 receptions for 1,007 yards, a 24-yard average (school record) and 9 touchdowns. As a senior, he registered 64 receptions (fifth in school history) for 1,166 yards (school record), an 18.2-yard average and 14 touchdowns (school record).

Morgan finished his college career with 106 receptions (sixth in school history), 2,173 yards (third in school history), a 20.5-yard average (school record) and 23 touchdowns (second in school history). He became one of only seven KSU players to catch more than one hundred passes, one of only four players with more than 2,000 receiving yards, second with eight 100-yard games. He was also the only Wildcat to notch 1,000 receiving yards in two consecutive seasons.

Professional career

Cleveland Browns
Morgan was selected by the Cleveland Browns in the second round (33rd overall) of the 2001 NFL Draft. As a rookie, he passed Dennis Northcutt on the depth chart and started 9 games. He made 10 receptions for 432 yards and 2 touchdowns.

In 2002, he had his best season as a professional, recording 56 receptions for 964 yards, a 17.2-yard average (led the NFL) and 7 touchdowns, while helping the team make the playoffs. In the season opener against the Kansas City Chiefs, he had 9 receptions for 151 yards and 2 touchdowns, but his effort was lost after linebacker Dwayne Rudd committed what is known in Browns lore as “Helmetgate”, after taking off his helmet to celebrate with less than 10 seconds left on the clock and the Browns clinging to a 39–37 lead, which drew a critical unsportsmanlike conduct penalty. His most memorable catch was a Hail Mary touchdown reception with no time left against the Jacksonville Jaguars on December 8, sealing a 21–20 win.

In 2003, he started 15 games, collecting 38 receptions for 516 yards and 3 touchdowns.

In 2004, he started 5 games, collecting 9 receptions for 144 yards and 3 touchdowns. On October 19, he was traded to the Dallas Cowboys in exchange for wide receiver Antonio Bryant, following a public dispute between Bryant and Cowboys head coach Bill Parcells.

Dallas Cowboys
In 2004, Morgan would have a rather mediocre season with the Cowboys in 2004, despite his rapid elevation on the depth chart following an injury to Terry Glenn, finishing with 22 receptions for 260 yards. In 2005, Morgan performed poorly in an unexpected depth chart battle against second-year player Patrick Crayton and Parcells began to perceive him as uncompetitive, dropping him to fourth on the depth chart.  He was released in order for the Cowboys to pick up wide receiver Peerless Price off waivers on September 5.

Pittsburgh Steelers
On September 6, 2005, he was signed by the Pittsburgh Steelers, reuniting former Browns offensive coordinator Bruce Arians. He was mostly used to return kickoffs, ranking fifth in the AFC with 23 returns for 583 yards and a 25.3-yard average. He also had 9 receptions for 150 yards and 2 touchdowns. He suffered a fractured fibula in the first-round playoff game against the Cincinnati Bengals, missing the rest of the playoff run towards winning Super Bowl XL winning team. He was released on September 2, 2006.

Denver Broncos
On September 18, 2006, he signed as a free agent with the Denver Broncos to return kickoffs. He appeared in 7 games, registering 17	returns for 423 yards and a 24.9-yard average. He was released on September 1, 2007.

Personal life
He ran a trucking company after he retired from football.

References

1977 births
Living people
People from Garland, Texas
Players of American football from Texas
Sportspeople from the Dallas–Fort Worth metroplex
American football wide receivers
Blinn Buccaneers football players
Kansas State Wildcats football players
Cleveland Browns players
Dallas Cowboys players
Pittsburgh Steelers players
Denver Broncos players